Diporiphora margaretae is a species of agama found in the Kimberley region of Australia.

References

Diporiphora
Agamid lizards of Australia
Taxa named by Glen Milton Storr
Reptiles described in 1974